Provincial elections were held in the Netherlands, on 7 March 2007. The election also determined the members of the Senate, since the 564 members of the twelve provincial councils elect its 75 members. This election took place on 29 May 2007.

Background
Only a few weeks before the provincial elections, a new cabinet has been installed, the fourth Balkenende cabinet, consisting of the CDA, PvdA and CU. The provincial elections will be the first test for this new cabinet. Since the provincial councils elect the members of the Senate, it is possible that the CDA, PvdA and CU will not obtain a majority in the Senate. Since the members of the Senate can reject new laws, the outcome of the provincial elections can seriously hamper the strength of the new cabinet.

National results
In recent years, the turnout for provincial elections were low, this year was no different. On 13:00, only 14% of the 12.1 million eligible voters had cast a vote. On 16:00, about 25% had cast a vote; of the larger cities, The Hague was on the low side with less than 20%, and Groningen at the high side with 29%.

The Socialist Party (SP), Christian Union (CU) and Party for the Animals showed the largest gains, all continuing their successful spell from the 2006 general election. The CDA, PvdA, D66, the LPF and SGP showed the greatest losses, while the VVD and GroenLinks only suffered a marginal loss. The current government of CDA, PvdA and CU are expected to hold on to a majority in the Senate (elections to be held in May), with 41 out of the 75 seats. Geert Wilders had already announced in January 2007 that his Party for Freedom would not take part in the elections, since it had not succeeded to be able to participate in all provinces. One important factor in comparing the 2003 and 2007 results is the fact that the number of members of each provincial legislature was lowered, from a maximum 73 to a maximum 55.

Results by province

Drenthe

Flevoland

Friesland

Gelderland

Groningen

Limburg

North Brabant

North Holland

Overijssel

South Holland

Utrecht

Zeeland

References

Provincial
2007
Dutch provincial elections